Hayrikyan (Armenian: Հայրիկեան, also transliterated as Hayrikian, Ayrikyan, Airikian) is an Armenian family name, literally meaning "descendant of Hayrik".

Paruyr Hayrikyan, Armenian politician
 Abraham Hayrikian, Armenian turkologist, director of Ardi college, member of Armenian National Assembly -  A victim of the Armenian Genocide